Monster Warriors is an original Canadian television series which aired on YTV in Canada and also on Jetix since April 2006 in the United Kingdom. It was created by Wilson Coneybeare and produced by Coneybeare Stories. The series concluded its run on July 26, 2008, with a TV movie titled Monster Warriors Finale on YTV.

Plot

Season 1
The series, a purposely campy cross between the Power Rangers and Ghostbusters, follows the adventures of four teenagers fighting to safeguard Capital City from the vengeful wrath of insane and disgruntled old B-Movie director Klaus Von Steinhauer who possesses the ability to bring his cinematic monsters to life ("I make ze monsters big!"). Over the course of the series, various story arcs occur that expand the series' cast and city locations. Each week sees the teens customize common household objects into useful weapons to fight against monstrous creations.

Season 2
The battle continues as the Monster Warriors work from their new hideout: a deserted secret bomb shelter beneath Luke's house. The newly outfitted warriors get caught in the battle between Von Steinhauer and the new Mystery Monster Maker. The new monsters are half animal, half machine.

Characters

Core characters
 Luke
Luke is the reserved yet tough leader of the Warriors. He is rich, tall and handsome and holds the keys to the group's sweet purple convertible and their headquarters at his home. He is Tabby's love interest. Although he acts tough most of the time, he still has certain fears, particularly of forests. His family fortune comes from his environmental activist parents' invention of coin deposit locks on shopping carts.
 Antonio
Antonio is the darkly handsome scientific genius of the gang. As a recent immigrant to Capital City, he devoted his considerable intellectual abilities to learning to speak English without any trace of a foreign accent, and he has a vast knowledge of fields like zoology, astronomy, geology and history. Although he is shy and kind of nerdy, he still has many female admirers.
 Tabby
This blond 17-year-old fancies herself the second in command of the group and is Luke's love interest. She is an ace inventor who can turn ordinary household gadgets into monster-blasting weaponry. She is also the captain of the volleyball team and school class president and is an all-around goody two-shoes- although she doesn't like being called one.
 Vanka
She is the bravest of the Warriors and a dedicated practitioner of obscure martial arts. Tough, fierce and virtually fearless, the athletic brunette is, however, particularly uncomfortable with heights, has failed her driving test multiple times and has had a string of hopeless boyfriends. She later develops a relationship with Antonio.

Other recurring characters
 Klaus Von Steinhauer - Monster movie director turned mad monster-maker.
 Missy Gore - Perky, narcoleptic city power company worker turned villainous sidekick (Season 1). Although she developed feelings for the much older Klaus, in Season 2 she left for dentistry school.
 Mayor Mel - Mayor of Capital City, a former actor in Von Steinhauer movies turned above ground pool salesman turned politician with a never-ending faith in the Monster Warriors. (Possibly based on former Toronto mayor Mel Lastman)
 Henry - A young boy who sends messages from the future and is the leader of the future Capital City Rebellion.
 Kreeger - Big, bearded monster movie expert and owner of the Monster Video movie rentals/comics and collectibles shop.
 Superintendent McClellan - Mayor Mel's ambitious and incompetent adviser who constantly suspects teenagers are behind all wrongdoing in Capital City. He becomes mayor in the second season but resigns and goes back to being superintendent in Astrosaurus vs Gigantobeast. He is always on the phone or yelling.
 Dink Doorman - A news reporter whose stories often revolve around the Monster Warriors and their battles and who also hosts a call-in movie show called "The Big Money Movie". Apparently does not know the meaning of the word "incredulous", often using it instead of "incredible".
 Fire Chief Holswade – Tabby’s father, the fire department chief.
 Eustace McCafferty – nerdy high school student that is in the school science club and astronomy club.

Cast
 Jared Keeso – Luke
 Lara Amersey – Vanka
 Mandy Butcher – Tabby
 Yani Gellman – Antonio
 Seán Cullen – Klaus Von Steinhauer
 Glenn Coulson – Dink Dorman
 Mike 'Nug' Nahrgang – Kreeger
 Adam Growe – Superintendent McClellan

New characters in Season 2
 Mystery Monster Maker – an unsuspected citizen of Capital City, the aliens' new agent to create more dangerous monsters.
 Lucy - a brilliant and, as Antonio puts it, cute girl that Luke meets at the hockey rink.
 George Junior – Superintendent McClellan's son.
 Dana the Diner Waitress – a happy-go-lucky, no-nonsense girl who works at the local diner and the local tech support company.
 General Grabjaw – The leader of the aliens.
 Ely Henry as Eustace

Monsters
 Mysterious aliens – An unknown race of colourful bald, big-headed aliens secretly controlling those who create the monsters. They can take human form, and their plan is to destroy Capital City, though the reason is unknown.
 Giant Spiders – The first of the monsters that the warriors battle. (possibly based on Kumonga)
 Kraken – A giant squid that destroys the harbour day in the city and sucks one of the Warriors in.
 Giant Alligators – Found in the sewers.
 60-foot Bumblebee – Tried to drain Capital City's power supply.
 Skeleton Crew – A small tactical strike team of living green skeletons that tried to poison Capital City's water.
 T. Rex – Found in a carnival.
 Giant Anaconda – Found in the North Woods. (possibly based on Manda)
 Alien Zombie from the Planet Zeenom – Not related to the mystery aliens although it does resemble them, it was created by accident when Klaus' Monster Machine broke and zapped Missy's comic book. This intelligent and benevolent giant monster is featured in seasons 1 and 2.
 Pterodactyls – This monster is featured in season 1 and season 2. (possibly based on Rodan)
 Praying Mantis – This monster was also featured in both seasons. (possibly based on Kamacuras)
 Killer Vine – A vine that grows and grows and is later killed by the giant slug.
 Giant Slug – A monster sent by Klaus to stop the killer vine from eating him.
 Carnivorous Butterfly – A butterfly that eats meat and can enchant its victims with its beauty so it can catch them more easily. (possibly based on Mothra)
 Cockroaches – Were fried by a gas explosion underneath Capital city.
 Dragon – A dragon that captures Vanka.
This monster is featured in both seasons.
 Lobster – Emerged from a beach in Capital City.
 Blob – A monster that somehow appears to consume Mayor Mel and almost does the same to Vanka.
 Worm – An earthworm that eats subway trains.
 Giant Metal-Eating Radioactive Junk Monster – One of Klaus' seemingly failed experiments, but when he threw it out it started absorbing all the metal in the junkyard, becoming a radioactive menace so deadly even Klaus wanted to destroy it.
 Termites – Found in the fire station's basement. Then the queen trapped Mayor Mel in City Hall.
 Giant Mud Monster – A monster made out of mud. (possibly based on Hedorah)
 Man-Eating Piranhas – Man-eating fish that can fly and come out of water.
 Enormous Ladybug – Was shrunken back to normal size by Tabby's weapon that was later smashed. Klaus never got a chance to finish it so it is one of the few "friendly" Monsters.
 Giant Sea Cucumber – Eats Vanka's new teacher, who was apparently a "mysterious alien" in disguise.
 Stink Bugs – Unlike other monsters, these giant swarms of stink bugs are a great danger to Capital City. They use their stink powder to choke or poison enemies.
 Mechanical Monkey – A giant robotic monkey, set on hunting Superintendent McClellan. (possibly based on Mechani-Kong)
 Giant Jelly Fish – A natural monster Antonio accidentally brought out when he was testing underwater research equipment.
 Big Foot – A natural monster found in the North Woods.
 Mega Bat – Giant bats with large tusks that can impale victims below.
 Monumonsters – Statues out of Capital City park.
 Troglothals – One-eyed troll-like monsters made out of action figures.
 Astrosaurus – A molten lava dinosaur.
 Gigantobeast – A giant robot.
 Computer Bugs – Emerged from the computer system.
 Lagoon Man – A monster born out of a Capital City legend.
 Ratblaster – A giant rat that ate Luke's monsterblaster and mutated. It's Antonio's belief that the rat came from other monsters they've defeated in the past, specifically the giant carnivorous butterfly and the Junk monster, and that the rat was once normal sized.
 Gigantic Penguins
 Gnomes – Garden Gnomes come alive after one of Klaus Von Steinhauer's inventions goes off accidentally.

Episodes

Season 1
This * means the Episodes that are available on DVD.

Season 2

DVD releases
Monster Warriors Vs. Creepy Crawlers: Volume 1 was released on June 30, 2009.

Features 5 Episodes:

"The Giant Spider Invasion"(Episode #1)

"Buzz!"(Episode #4)

"Attack of the Giant Carnivorous Butterfly"(Episode #14)

"Marauding Mantis"(Episode #19)

& "Attack of the Enormous Terrifying Ladybug"(Episode #23)

Monster Warriors:War of the Water World - Volume 2 was released on August 25, 2009.

Features 5 Episodes:

"The Beast From Beneath the Sea"(Episode #2)

"Day of the Piranha"(Episode #22)

"Voyage to the Bottom of the Sea Cucumber"(Episode #24)

"Ribbit"(Episode #25)

& "Ribbit 2: Froggy's Revenge"(Episode #26)

Plus 1 Bonus Episode:  "The Giant Lobster Invasion"(Episode #9)

Monster Warriors:Mutant Madness - Volume 3 was released on November 24, 2009.

Features 5 Episodes:

"The Terror Underground"(Episode #5)

"Last Ride of the Skeleton Crew"(Episode #10)

"Attack of the Junk Monster"(Episode #11)

"Fall of the Haunted House of T-Rex"(Episode #13)

& "Alien Zombie from the Planet Zeenom"(Episode #17)

Monster Warriors:Creature Feature - Volume 4 was released on March 30, 2010.

Features 5 Episodes:

"Gators"(Episode #3)

"The Incredible Ice Monster!"(Episode #6)

"Dawn of the Dragon!"(Episode #7)

"Attack of the Giant Anaconda!"(Episode #8)

& "Pterodactyl Terror!"(Episode #12)

So far only 21 Episodes from the first season are on DVD, but North Video from the Czech Republic has all episodes of the first series on DVD in Czech and English.

Trivia
Show creator Wilson Coneybeare is the son of Canadian icon Rod Coneybeare, who makes a cameo appearance in one episode as the homeless former mayor of Capital City.

References

External links
 

2006 Canadian television series debuts
2008 Canadian television series endings
Canadian television series with live action and animation
2000s Canadian children's television series
YTV (Canadian TV channel) original programming
Television shows filmed in Toronto
Canadian television shows featuring puppetry
Television series about monsters
Television series about teenagers
Television shows filmed in Ontario
Culture of Barrie